Berbérati Airport  is an airport serving Berbérati, the capital of the Mambéré-Kadéï prefecture in the Central African Republic.

Facilities 
The runway has a short (less than ) paved overrun on each end.

The Berberati VOR (Ident: BT) is located on the field.

See also

Transport in the Central African Republic
List of airports in the Central African Republic

References

External links 
OpenStreetMap - Berbérati Airport
OurAirports - Berbérati Airport

Airports in the Central African Republic
Buildings and structures in Mambéré-Kadéï